The 8th Macau International Movie Festival ceremony, organized by the Macau Film and Television Media Association and China International Cultural Communication Center, honored the best films of 2016 in the Greater China Region and took place on 15 December 2016, in Macau.

Winners and nominees

References

External links

Golden Lotus Awards
Macau
2016 in Macau
Gold